Epicenity is the lack of gender distinction, often reducing the emphasis on the  masculine to allow the feminine. It includes androgyny – having both masculine and feminine characteristics. The adjective gender-neutral may describe epicenity (and both terms are associated with the terms gender-neutral language, gender-neutral pronoun, gender-blind, and unisex).

Specialized uses
In linguistics, an epicene word has the same form for male and for female referents. In some cases, the term common gender is also used, but should not be confused with common or appellative as a contrary to proper (as in proper noun).
In English, for example, the epicene (or common) nouns cousin and violinist can refer to a man or a woman, and so can the epicene (or common) pronoun one. The noun stewardess and the third-person singular pronouns he and she on the other hand are not epicene (or common).

In languages with grammatical gender, the term epicene can be used in two distinct situations:

The same word can refer to either masculine or feminine signified concept, while retaining its own, either masculine or feminine, grammatical gender. For example, Classical Greek  'hare' is masculine, but can refer to male and female hares (he-hares and she-hares), and  'fox' is feminine, but can refer to male and female foxes (he-foxes and she-foxes).  For this meaning, the term common gender is different from epicene gender.
An article, noun, adjective, or pronoun has identical masculine and feminine forms, but they don't follow always one agreement pattern.

In French
In the French language, the noun  'schoolchild' and the adjective  'mischievous' can be either masculine or feminine, but they are differentiated by the article:

The same can happen in French with the epicene elided singular articles, the definite and undefinite plural articles, and the contractions  ( + ) and  when in contact with the noun, so the adjective takes the task of marking the gender:

For these meanings the term common is also used.

However, there can be cases where the agreement cannot force the disambiguation, even with the presence of pronoun, article, noun and adjective when they are all epicene:

This can be further complicated when dealing with spoken French (when some orthographical nuances are lost).

In Spanish
In the Spanish language, there are very few cases where a noun ignores the semantic gender of the referent. For example, the noun  'person' is grammatically feminine, and only takes any supporting article or adjective in agreement with this gender.

As the gender of the referent of an epicene is ambiguous it may be necessary to add an adjective to clarify, but the gender of this adjective will also be in agreement with the epicene, for example in the case of the noun  'victim' which is also an epicene.

See also

 Gender marking in job titles
 Gender neutrality in English
 Generic antecedent
 Male as norm
 Unisex name

References

Androgyny
Effeminacy
Gender-neutral language
Grammatical gender